The 2008 Louisiana Tech Bulldogs football team represented Louisiana Tech University as a member of the Western Athletic Conference (WAC) during the 2008 NCAA Division I FBS football season. Led by second-year head coach Derek Dooley, the Bulldogs played their home games at Joe Aillet Stadium in Ruston, Louisiana. Dooley's Bulldogs entered the season after finishing 5–7 (4–4 WAC) in 2007. Louisiana Tech kicked off the season with a victory over Mississippi State, finished tied for second place in the WAC, and capped off the year with an Independence Bowl victory over Northern Illinois.

Before the season

Recruiting

T-Day spring game

On April 12, 2008, the White Team came from behind to beat the Blue Team 14–13 at Joe Aillet Stadium. Defense dominated the first half as neither team's offense could muster a score. With nine seconds remaining in the second quarter, the Blue Team's Jay Dudley blocked a Brad Oestricher field goal attempt, and Brian White recovered the ball and ran 71 yards for a touchdown. The extra point was missed, and the Blue Team went into the locker room with a 6-0 halftime lead. In the third quarter, the Blue Team extended their lead to 13–0 on a trick play as TE Dennis Morris tossed a touchdown pass to WR Philip Beck. Just seconds into the fourth quarter, RB William Griffin rushed for a three-yard touchdown for the White Team's first score of the game. Later in the fourth quarter, QB Ross Jenkins connected on a thirty-yard touchdown pass to WR Phillip Livas to complete the White Team's 14-13 comeback win. LB Quin Harris led the White Team with four tackles including a sack. Josh Victorian had 3.5 tackles and pulled in an interception. The Blue Team's D'Anthony Smith had four tackles on the day with two sacks. Shawn Simmons led the Blue Team with 8.5 tackles. LB Jay Dudley had 5.5 tackles with a sack. Brian White added an interception to go with his return for a touchdown, and safety Deon Young added another interception.

Schedule

Coaching staff

Game summaries

Mississippi State

Kansas

Southeastern Louisiana

Boise State

Hawaii

Idaho

Army

Fresno State

San Jose State

Utah State

New Mexico State

Nevada

Northern Illinois

Statistics

Team

Scores by quarter

Offense

Rushing

Passing

Receiving

Defense

Special teams

References

Louisiana Tech
Louisiana Tech Bulldogs football seasons
Independence Bowl champion seasons
Louisiana Tech Bulldogs football